Swing Fever is a 1943 American musical comedy film directed by Tim Whelan.  Kay Kyser plays an ambitious music composer, also gifted with a hypnotic "evil eye", who gets mixed up with promoting a boxer. The film also features Marilyn Maxwell, William Gargan, Nat Pendleton and Lena Horne. Amid the credited music and boxing-world cameos many other familiar faces can be glimpsed:  Tommy Dorsey, Harry James, Mike Mazurki, Mantan Moreland, and a young Ava Gardner.

Cast

References

External links 
 
 
 

1943 films
Films directed by Tim Whelan
Metro-Goldwyn-Mayer films
1943 musical comedy films
American musical comedy films
American black-and-white films
1940s American films
1940s English-language films
Films scored by Georgie Stoll